Kabara  and or Magajiya is the title used by the matriarchal monarchs that ruled the Hausa people in medieval times. The Kano Chronicle gives the following list of Matriarchal monarchs that was said to have culminated and ended with the rule of Daurama II, the last Kabara of Daura.

Kabaras
List of Kabaras:
 
Kufuru
Ginu
Yakumo
Yakunya
Wanzamu
Yanbamu
Gizir-gizir
Inna-Gari
Daurama
Ga-Wata
Shata
Fatatuma
Sai-Da-Mata
Ja-Mata
Ha-Mata
Zama
Sha-Wata
Daurama II

References

Hausa people
History of Northern Nigeria
Sahelian kingdoms